Daphne is a feminine given name of Greek origin meaning laurel. It originates from Greek mythology, where Daphne (Greek: Δάφνη) was a naiad, a variety of female nymph associated with fountains, wells, springs, streams, brooks and other bodies of freshwater. The name came into popular use in the Anglosphere in the late 1800s along with other flower, tree, and plant names that were in vogue at the time. In recent years, the name has increased in popularity due to a character on the streaming television series Bridgerton.

Usage
Daphne has been among the one thousand most used names for girls in the United States most years since 1889.  It has also been well-used in recent years in the United Kingdom, Quebec, Canada, France, and the Netherlands.

Notable persons 
Daphne (born 1989), Cameroonian singer
Daphné, French singer
Daphne Arden (born 1941)
Daphne Ashbrook (born 1963), American actress
Daphne Barak-Erez (born 1965), Israeli law professor
Daphne Bavelier
Daphne Berdahl (1964–2007)
Dafni Bokota (born 1960), Greek singer and TV presenter
Daphne Brooker (1927–2012), British model, costume designer, and fashion professor
Daphne Brooks (born 1968)
Daphne Brown (1948–2011)
Daphne Campbell (born 1957)
Daphne Caruana Galizia (1964–2017), Maltese journalist and blogger
Daphne Ceeney (1934–2016)
Daphné Collignon (born 1977), French comic book author
Daphne Courtney (born 1917)
Dafna Dekel (born 1966), Israeli singer, actress and television personality
Daphne du Maurier (1907–1989), English writer
Daphne Gail Fautin
Daphne Fielding (1904–1997), English socialite and writer
Daphne Fitzpatrick (born 1964)
Daphne Foskett (1911–1998), English art connoisseur and art writer
Daphne Fowler (born 1939), English game show champion
Daphne Gautschi (born 2000), Swiss handball player
Daphne Gottlieb (born 1968)
Daphne Guinness (born 1967), Irish artist and socialite
Daphne Lorraine Gum (1916–2017)
Daphne Haldin (1899–1973)
Daphne Hampson (born 1944), British theologian
Daphne Hardy Henrion (1917–2003)
Daphne Hasenjäger (born 1929)
Daphne Heard (1904–1983)
Daphne Iking (born 1978)
Daphne Jackson (1938–1991)
Daphne Jennings (born 1939)
Daphne Jongejans (born 1965)
Daphne Jordan, American politician
Daphne Khoo (born 1987)
Daphni Leef (born 1986), Israeli social activist
Daphne Matziaraki, Greek director, writer and producer
Daphne Mayo (1895–1982)
Daphne Merkin (born 1954), American writer
Daphne Odjig (1919–2016)
Daphne Olivier (1889–1950)
Daphne Park (1921–2010), British diplomat and spy
Daphne Patai (born 1943), American educator
Daphne Pearson (1911–2000)
Daphne Phelps (1911–2005)
Daphne Pochin Mould (1920–2014)
Daphne Pollard (1892–1978)
Daphne Reynolds (1918–2002), English painter and printmaker
Daphne Robinson (1932–2008)
Daphne Sheldrick, DBE (1934 – 2018), founder of the Sheldrick Wildlife Trust.
Daphne Spain
Daphne Todd (born 1947)
Daphne Touw (born 1970)
Daphne Trimble (born 1953)
Daphne Wayans (born 1971)
Daphne Willis (born 1987)
Daphne Woodward, French-English translator
Daphne Zuniga (born 1962), American actress

Fictional characters
Daphne Blake, a character in the television cartoon series Scooby-Doo
Daphne Sullivan, a character in The White Lotus
Daphne Broon, a character in the Scottish cartoon strip The Broons
Daphne Clarke, from the Australian soap opera Neighbours
Daphne Greengrass, a character in the Harry Potter series
Daphne Hatzilakos, a character in the Canadian television series Degrassi: The Next Generation
Daphne Millbrook, a character in the television series Heroes
Daphne Moon, a character in the television show Frasier
Daphne Millicent Turner, the Malory Towers books
Princess Daphne (character), a character in the video game Dragon's Lair
Princess Daphne the nymph, a character in the Italian cartoon series Winx Club
Daphne Grimm, a character from The Sisters Grimm book series
Daphne Vasquez, a character in the television show Switched at Birth
Daphne Reynolds, main character from the film What a Girl Wants
The Groovy Girls doll line, by Manhattan Toy, features a doll named Daphne
Daphne Bridgerton. A character from the Netflix series Bridgerton
Daphne Minton, a character from the web series and series 3 doll line of Rainbow High.

Notes

See also 
 Dafne (given name)
 Dafni § People
 Daphna

English feminine given names
French feminine given names
Given names derived from plants or flowers
Greek feminine given names
Hebrew feminine given names
Irish feminine given names